Infantry Branch may refer to:
Royal Australian Infantry Corps, the organisation to which all Australian infantry regiments belong
Royal Canadian Infantry Corps, the organisation to which all Canadian infantry regiments belong
Infantry Branch (United States), a branch of the United States Army first established in 1775.